James Noir's Hollywood Crimes (known in Europe as James Noir's Hollywood Crimes 3D) is a puzzle game developed by Ubisoft for the Nintendo 3DS and iOS. The game is set within a TV game show in the 1960s and the player must solve puzzles to defeat a mysterious criminal mastermind. The player takes on the role of a contestant working their way through 6 stages of a game show as Hollywood becomes the staging ground for a set of gruesome crimes. The game stars Elias Toufexis who played Adam Jensen in Deus Ex: Human Revolution.

Reception 

The game received "mixed" reviews on both platforms according to the review aggregation website Metacritic.

References

External links 
 Announcement Trailer
 

2011 video games
IOS games
Nintendo 3DS games
Puzzle video games
Video games developed in Canada
Video games set in the 1960s
Video games set in Los Angeles